Joan M. Menard (born September 6, 1935 in New York City) is a retired American politician who also served as the vice president for work force development, lifelong learning, grant development and external affairs at Bristol Community College.

From 1979 to 2000, Menard represented the 5th Bristol District in the Massachusetts House of Representatives. In 1991, she served as the House Assistant Majority Whip and in 1984 and again from 1992 to 1996, she was the Majority Whip.

From 1993 to 2000, Menard served as the Chairman of the Massachusetts Democratic Party.

In 1999, Menard was elected to the Massachusetts Senate; filling the vacancy caused by Thomas C. Norton's appointment to the Massachusetts Low-level Radioactive Waste Management Board. She represented the 1st Bristol and Plymouth District until her retirement in 2011. From 2003 to 2011, Menard was the Senate Majority Whip.

According to the Massachusetts Open Checkbook list of state pensions, Menard is currently receiving a pension from Massachusetts at a rate of $99,297 annually.

References

External links 
 Personal web site

1935 births
Democratic Party Massachusetts state senators
Boston University alumni
Living people
Massachusetts Democratic Party chairs
Women state legislators in Massachusetts
Bridgewater State University alumni
People from Somerset, Massachusetts
20th-century American politicians
20th-century American women politicians
21st-century American politicians
21st-century American women politicians